Philip David Lewis (born 4 October 1981) is an English cricketer.  Lewis is a right-handed batsman who bowls right-arm fast-medium.  He was born in Liss, Hampshire.

Having played Second XI cricket for the Somerset Second XI in 2002, Lewis made his first-class debut for Loughborough UCCE against Surrey in 2003.  He appeared in 4 further first-class matches for Loughborough UCCE, the last coming against Sussex in 2004.  In his 5 matches, he scored 115 runs at a batting average of 28.75, with a high score of 43 not out.  With the ball, he took 10 wickets at a bowling average of 40.20, with best figures of 3/58.

Lewis made his debut for Dorset in the 2005 Minor Counties Championship against Wales Minor Counties.  He played 2 further matches for Dorset, against Berkshire in 2006 and Herefordshire.  He also played a single MCCA Knockout Trophy match against Staffordshire in 2006.

References

External links
Phil Lewis at ESPNcricinfo
Phil Lewis at CricketArchive

1981 births
Living people
People from Liss
English cricketers
Loughborough MCCU cricketers
Dorset cricketers